Sebastian Lykke Andersen (born 23 December 1988) is a retired Danish professional association football player who played as a left midfielder.

Club career

Herfølge BK
Andersen was promoted to the first team squad in 2006 and was named as the talent of the year in his club in 2007, where he also signed a new two-year contract with the club. The young midfielder had some good seasons at Herfølge, and was sold in 2009.

HB Køge
HB Køge signed the young talent in the summer 2009. He only played 16 league matches, before signing a contract with HB Køge in January 2010.

Esbjerg fB
On 13 January 2010 it was announced, that Andersen had signed a contract with Esbjerg fB valid from the summer 2010. Esbjerg wanted to sign him right away, and they managed to do it. On 2 February 2010 they announced, that he would transfer right away instead of the summer 2010. But due to the lack of playing time, he was loaned out to AC Horsens.

Loan to AC Horsens
AC Horsens signed Andersen on a loan deal on 31 January 2011 for the rest of the season.

Back to Esbjerg
After getting back from his loan stay, he slowly became a regular part of the team. Esbjerg got relegated to the Danish 1st Division. The relegation gave Andersen some more space in the squad and he played 25 games in his first season after his loan stay. Esbjerg got promoted to the Danish Superliga again in the next season, and Andersen was back on the bench. He played 28 games for the club, but 20 of them was as a substituter. Andersen didn't feel, that he had got the chance to show himself, and he wanted to leave the club.

Viborg FF
Andersen signed for Viborg FF on 3 September 2013. But the situation was the same at this club, as it was in Esbjerg.

Loan to Hobro IK
Andersen was loaned out to Hobro IK in January 2014.

Hobro IK
A month into his loan stay at Hobro, Viborg FF terminated his contract. The loan deal was therefore also cancelled and he signed a 6-months contract with Hobro the same day. After his arrival he said, that he thought he would get more time at Viborg and it probably was a mistake. He had a good half season in the club with 12 matches and 4 goals, before leaving the club at the end of his contract.

Viborg FF
Andersen returned surprisingly to Viborg on 28 June 2014. He was reunited with his former manager from HB Køge, Auri Skarbalius. He played 61 league matches for the club before leaving in the summer 2016, when his contract expired. He later revealed, that he and the club had some different wishes, and they couldn't continue together.

Hobro IK
Andersen began training with Norwegian club, IK Start, after he left Viborg FF. One week later, he signed with Hobro IK. In the same season, Hobro was promoted to the Danish Superliga again, however, Andersen didn't want to continue at the club.

Fremad Amager
On 30 May 2017 it was confirmed, that Andersen had joined Danish 1st Division club, Fremad Amager, on a free transfer. Andersen retired at the end of the 2018/19 season where he didn't play a single game due to a knee injury.

Coaching career
After retiring, Andersen was appointed assistant coach at Solrød FC in March 2021. In July 2021, he confirmed that he had left the club again, as he had got a new job as private insurer.

References

External links

Danish national team profile
Danish Superliga statistics

1988 births
Living people
Danish men's footballers
Danish Superliga players
Denmark under-21 international footballers
Herfølge Boldklub players
Esbjerg fB players
Viborg FF players
Hobro IK players
People from Køge Municipality
Association football midfielders
Fremad Amager players
Danish 1st Division players
Sportspeople from Region Zealand